James Francis Clark (December 26, 1887 – March 20, 1969) was a Major League Baseball player who played for the St. Louis Cardinals in  and .

External links

1887 births
1969 deaths
Major League Baseball center fielders
St. Louis Cardinals players
Baseball players from New York (state)
Erie Sailors players
Punxsutawney Policemen players
New Castle Outlaws players
Clarksburg Bees players
Sharon Giants players
Clarksburg Drummers players
Trenton Tigers players
Baltimore Orioles (IL) players
Johnstown Johnnies players
San Antonio Bronchos players
York White Roses players
Beaumont Oilers players
Austin Senators players